"On écrit sur les murs" (English: "We Write on the Walls") is a 1989 song by Greek singer Demis Roussos from the album Voice and Vision. Written by Romano Musumarra and Jean-Marie Moreau, it was released as first single from the album in January 1990 and achieved success in France where it peaked at number four. In 2015, Kids United covered the song on the album Un monde meilleur.

Critical reception
Elia Habib, an expert of French chart, gave a positive review of the song, stating that Musumarra "here confirms his know-how for simple and greatly catchy melodies"; he also adds that lyrically, "Roussos sings hope in an idealistic breath that the chorus powerfully conveys", as the latter is performed by a choir performs "a utopian spirit that the bridge orchestration amplifies".

Chart performance
In France, "On écrit sur les murs" can be considered as a sleeper hit, as it debuted at number 50 on the chart edition of 20 January 1990. Then it climbed regularly and peaked at number four for non consecutive two weeks. It remained for a total of 11 weeks in the top ten, and fell off the top 50 straight from number 20, after 23 weeks of presence. On the European Hot 100, it started at number 67 on 3 March 1990, reached a peak of number 16 twice, in its fifth and eleventh weeks, and spent 19 weeks on the chart.

Track listings
 7" single
 "On écrit sur les murs" — 3:34	
 "Time" — 4:16

 CD single
 "On écrit sur les murs" — 3:34	
 "Time" — 4:16

Credits
 Bagpipes – Christian Million
 Composition – Romano Musumara
 Engineer – Bruno Fourrier, Olivier de Bosson
 Lyrics – Jean-Marie Moreau
 Mixing – Jean-Philippe Bonichon
 Production – Loris Baccheschi, Romano Musumara
 Artwork – Nuit de Chine
 Photography – Youri Lenquette

Charts

Weekly charts

Year-end charts

Certifications

Kids United version

Weekly charts

Other cover versions
"On écrit sur les murs" was adapted by Worlds Apart in 2007. Les Enfoirés adapted the song twice: first in 2008, and was sung by Bénabar and Maxime Le Forestier with Francis Cabrel, Gérald de Palmas, Elsa Delétang, Patrick Fiori, (Garou, David Hallyday, Catherine Lara and Christophe Maé, then in 2017 with Tal, Soprano, Grégoire, Amir, Michaël Youn, Laure Pester, Jeff Panacloc, Liane Foly, Jean-Baptiste Maunier, Bénabar and Claire Keim as singers. In April 2016, it was covered by Canadian ban Raffy as the them song of the Fondation Véro et Louis, founded by Véronique Cloutier et Louis Morissette, which part of benefits from the song downloads were given to this association created to help Quebec people diagnosed with autism. This adaptation was successful and was number one on iTunes for several days.

References

1988 songs
1989 singles
2016 singles
2016 songs
French-language songs
Songs written by Romano Musumarra
Demis Roussos songs
Kids United songs